The 1966 Ohio State Buckeyes baseball team represented Ohio State University in the 1966 NCAA University Division baseball season. The team was coached by Marty Karow in his 16th season at Ohio State.

The Buckeyes won the College World Series, defeating the Oklahoma State Cowboys in the championship game.

Roster

Schedule 

! style="background:#999999;color:#990000;"| Regular Season
|- valign="top" 

|- align="center" bgcolor="#ddffdd"
| March 19 || at  || 10-3 || 1-0 || –
|- align="center" bgcolor="#ffdddd"
| March 19 || at Miami (FL) || 6-7 || 1-1 || –
|- align="center" bgcolor="#ffdddd"
| March 21 || vs.  || 0-3 || 1-2 || –
|- align="center" bgcolor="#ddffdd"
| March 22 || vs. Michigan State || 7-3 || 2-2 || –
|- align="center" bgcolor="#ddffdd"
| March 23 || vs.  || 15-2 || 3-2 || –
|- align="center" bgcolor="#ddffdd"
| March 23 || vs. NYU || 11-2 || 4-2 || –
|- align="center" bgcolor="#ddffdd"
| March 25 || vs.  || 7-3 || 5-2 || –
|- align="center" bgcolor="#ddffdd"
| March 26 || at Miami (FL) || 5-0 || 6-2 || –
|-

|- align="center" bgcolor="#ffdddd"
| April 1 ||  || 1-6 || 6-3 || –
|- align="center" bgcolor="#ffdddd"
| April 2 || Western Michigan || 3-4 || 6-4 || –
|- align="center" bgcolor="#ffdddd"
| April 2 || Western Michigan || 0-9 || 6-5 || –
|- align="center" bgcolor="#ddffdd"
| April 8 ||  || 4-1 || 7-5 || –
|- align="center" bgcolor="#ddffdd"
| April 9 || Saint Mary's || 3-1 || 8-5 || –
|- align="center" bgcolor="#ddffdd"
| April 9 || Saint Mary's || 5-1 || 9-5 || –
|- align="center" bgcolor="#ddffdd"
| April 15 ||  || 14-2 || 10-5 || –
|- align="center" bgcolor="#ddffdd"
| April 16 ||  || 2-1 || 11-5 || –
|- align="center" bgcolor="#ddffdd"
| April 16 || Cincinnati || 3-0 || 12-5 || –
|- align="center" bgcolor="#ddffdd"
| April 22 || at Michigan State || 2-0 || 13-5 || 1-0
|- align="center" bgcolor="#ddddff"
| April 26 || at  || 0-0 || 13-5-1 || –
|- align="center" bgcolor="#ddffdd"
| April 29 ||  || 7-0 || 14-5-1 || 2-0
|-

|- align="center" bgcolor="#ddffdd"
| May 3 || at  || 13-1 || 15-5-1 || –
|- align="center" bgcolor="#ddffdd"
| May 6 ||  || 8-2 || 16-5-1 || 3-0
|- align="center" bgcolor="#ddffdd"
| May 6 ||  || 15-1 || 17-5-1 || 4-0
|- align="center" bgcolor="#ddffdd"
| May 6 || Northwestern || 9-3 || 18-5-1 || 5-0
|- align="center" bgcolor="#ddffdd"
| May 21 ||  || 6-4 || 19-5-1 || 6-0
|-

|-
! style="background:#999999;color:#990000;"| Post-Season
|-
|-

|- align="center" bgcolor="#ddffdd"
| June 2 || vs.  || 13-3 || 20-5-1
|- align="center" bgcolor="#ddffdd"
| June 3 || vs. Western Michigan || 10-3 || 21-5-1
|- align="center" bgcolor="#ddffdd"
| June 4 || vs. Western Michigan || 14-7 || 22-5-1
|-

|- align="center" bgcolor="ddffdd"
| June 13 || vs. Oklahoma State || Rosenblatt Stadium || 4-2 || 23-5-1
|- align="center" bgcolor="ddffdd"
| June 14 || vs. Southern California || Rosenblatt Stadium || 6-2 || 24-5-1
|- align="center" bgcolor="ddffdd"
| June 15 || vs.  || Rosenblatt Stadium || 8-7 || 25-5-1
|- align="center" bgcolor="ffdddd"
| June 16 || vs. Southern California || Rosenblatt Stadium || 1-5 || 25-6-1
|- align="center" bgcolor="ddffdd"
| June 17 || vs. Southern California || Rosenblatt Stadium || 1-0 || 26-6-1
|- align="center" bgcolor="ddffdd"
| June 18 || vs. Oklahoma State || Rosenblatt Stadium || 8-2 || 27-6-1
|-

Awards and honors 
Steve Arlin
 All-America First Team
 All-Big Ten Second Team
 College World Series Most Outstanding Player

Chuck Brinkman
 All-America Second Team
 All-College World Series Team

Ross Nagelson
 All-College World Series Team

Bo Rein
 All-College World Series Team

Ray Shoup
 All-College World Series Team

Buckeyes in the 1966 MLB Draft 
The following members of the Ohio State Buckeyes baseball program were drafted in the 1966 Major League Baseball Draft.

References 

1966 Big Ten Conference baseball season
Ohio State Buckeyes baseball seasons
College World Series seasons
NCAA Division I Baseball Championship seasons
Big Ten Conference baseball champion seasons
Ohio State Buckeyes baseball